"The Ballad of Sally Anne" is a song with lyrics written by Alice Randall to a traditional tune which is unusual among country songs for the topic, a race lynching. The song was recorded by Mark O'Connor's band project New Nashville Cats.

References

1991 songs